Egl nine homolog 2 is a protein that in humans is encoded by the EGLN2 gene. ELGN2 is an alpha-ketoglutarate-dependent hydroxylase, a superfamily of non-haem iron-containing proteins.

The hypoxia inducible factor (HIF) is a transcriptional complex which is involved in oxygen homeostasis. At normal oxygen levels, the alpha subunit of HIF is targeted for degradation by prolyl hydroxylation. 
This gene encodes an enzyme responsible for this posttranslational modification. Multiple alternatively spliced variants, encoding the same protein, have been identified.

References

Further reading

Human 2OG oxygenases
EC 1.14.11